Pantai Kundor is a state constituency in Malacca, Malaysia, that has been represented in the Malacca State Legislative Assembly.

The state constituency was first contested in 2004 and is mandated to return a single Assemblyman to the Malacca State Legislative Assembly under the first-past-the-post voting system. , the State Assemblyman for Pantai Kundor is Mohd Hasim from United Malays National Organisation (UMNO) which is part of the state's ruling coalition, Barisan Nasional (BN).

Definition 
The Pantai Kundor constituency contains the polling districts of Ayer Salak, Paya Luboh, Pantai Puteri, Kampung Gelam, Pengkalan Perigi, Pengkalan Lanjut and Sungai Lereh.

Demographics

History

Polling districts
According to the gazette issued on 31 October 2022, the Pantai Kundor constituency has a total of 7 polling districts.

Representation history

Election results

References

Malacca state constituencies